The Basra Vilayet was a first-level administrative division (vilayet) of the Ottoman Empire. It historically covered an area stretching from Nasiriyah and Amarah in the north to Kuwait in the south. To the south and the west, there was theoretically no border at all, yet no areas beyond Qatar in the south and the Najd Sanjak in the west were later on included in the administrative system.

The accuracy of the population figures ranges from "approximate" to "merely conjectural" depending on the region from which they were gathered.

The capital of the vilayet, Basra, was an important military centre, with a permanent garrison of 400 to 500 men, and was home to the Ottoman Navy in the Persian Gulf.

History
It was a vilayet from 1875 to 1880, and again after 1884, when it was recreated from the southern sanjaks of the Baghdad Vilayet.

After 1884, the vilayet was briefly expanded down the littoral of the Gulf to incorporate Najd and al-Hasa, including Hofuf, Qatar, and Qatif, the incorporation of Najd only lasted until 1913 before the end of the Basra Vilayet.

In 1899, Shaikh Mubarak concluded a treaty with Britain, stipulating that Britain would protect Kuwait against any external aggression, de facto turning it into a British protectorate. Despite the Kuwaiti government's desire to either be independent or under British rule, the British concurred with the Ottoman Empire in defining Kuwait as an autonomous caza of the Ottoman Empire. This would last until World War I. 

Basra fell to the British on 22 November 1914, and the Mesopotamian Expeditionary Force had occupied almost the whole of the vilayet by July 1915.

Administrative divisions

Sanjaks of the vilayet: 
 Amara Sanjak
 Basra Sanjak
 Diwanniyya Sanjak
 Muntafiq Sanjak
 Najd Sanjak; from 1875, conquered by the Saudis in 1913.

Governors
Governors of the Basra Vilayet:

 Nasir Pasha (1875–1877)
 Vekili Ferik Mehmed Münir Pasha (1877–1879)
 Ferik Sabit Pasha (1879–1880)
 Mazhar Pasha (1880–1882)
 Yahya Pasha (1882–1884)
 Ali Riza Pasha (1884–1886)
 Izzet Pasha (1886–1888)
 Ferik Shaban Pasha (1888)
 Hidayat Pasha (1888–1891)
 Mehmed Hafiz Pasha (1891–1892)
 Bahriye Komutani Emin Pasha (1892)
 Ferik Mahmut Hamdi Pasha (1892–1893)
 Mehmed Hafiz Pasha (1893)
 Hamdi Pasha (1st time) (1893–1896)
 Arif Pasha (December 1896 – February 1898)
 Mehmed Enis Pasha (March 1898 – April 1899)
 Hamdi Pasha (2nd time) (April 1899 – January 1900)
 Mehmed Muhsin Pasha (January 1900 – September 1902)
 Mustafa Nuri Pasha (September 1902 – September 1906)
 Abdurrahman Hasan Bey (September 1906 – August 1908)
 Muharram Efendi (August 1908 – February 1908)
 Marchdine Mehmed Arif Bey (February 1909 – September 1909)
 Süleyman Nazif Bey (September 1909 – November 1910)
 Kavurzade Huseyin Celal Bey (December 1910 – July 1911)
 Bagdali Hasan Riza Pasha (July 1911 – December 1912)
 Malik Efendi (December 1912 – February 1913)
 Ali Riza Pasha (Feb 1913 – March 1913)
 Alaeddin Bey Altaz (March 1913 – July 1913)
 Izzet Pasha (July 1913 – December 1913)
 Söylemezoglu Süleyman Sefik Pasha (December 1913 – July 1914)
 Subhi Bey (July 1914 – November 1914)
 Süleyman `Askari Pasha (November 1914 – 1916)
 Khalil Pasha (1916 – 11 March 1917)

See also
 Anglo-Ottoman Convention of 1913

References

External links

History of Kuwait
Vilayets of the Ottoman Empire in Asia
Ottoman Iraq
1875 establishments in the Ottoman Empire
1918 disestablishments in the Ottoman Empire